Babu Janardhanan is an Indian screenwriter and director, known for Malayalam films.

Biography

Personal life
He was born at Changanassery, Kerala, as the son of Mr. Janardanan and Mrs. Pankajakshi. Babu Janardhanan did his schooling at Madappally Govt. LPS and Govt. Higher Secondary School, Thrikkodithaanam and Pursued higher studies at AP School of Arts, Kottayam. He began his career as a school teacher at CPPHMHS, Ozhur, Tirur in Malappuram district. He is married to Sheeba. The couple have two children, Neelima and Niranjan.

Film career
His debut movie was Anandavruthantham directed by P. Anil in 1990.

In 2005, Achanurangatha Veedu collected the best second movie award in the Kerala State Film Awards. Salim Kumar, who played the protagonist in the movie won the best supporting actor award. In 2006, Vaasthavam brought Prithiviraj the state award for the best actor. In 2008, Thalappavu won Lal the state award for the best actor in the Kerala State Film Awards.

Filmography

As screenwriter only

As director and writer

References

20th-century Indian film directors
Malayalam film directors
Film directors from Kerala
Living people
21st-century Indian film directors
People from Changanassery
21st-century Indian dramatists and playwrights
20th-century Indian dramatists and playwrights
Screenwriters from Kerala
Malayalam screenwriters
Year of birth missing (living people)